Stormy Six were an Italian progressive and folk rock band founded in Milan in 1966. They performed and recorded until 1983, mostly as a sextet but occasionally as a quartet, a quintet and a septet. Although their line-up changed considerably over the years, founding member Franco Fabbri remained with the group for its entire duration. In May 1993 they performed at a re-union concert in Milan, which was recorded and released on a CD, Un Concerto (1995).

Stormy Six were best known as one of the five original Rock in Opposition (RIO) bands that performed at the first RIO festival in March 1978 in London. They later participated actively in the shaping of RIO as an organisation and performed across Europe with other RIO and related bands.

History
Stormy Six began in 1966 as a pop/psychedelic rock band, opening for The Rolling Stones on their first Italian tour in 1967. After some line-up changes Stormy Six switched to left-wing/protest folk rock and their first three albums, recorded in the late 1960s and early 1970s, reflect this style. In the mid 1970s their music became more complex and they started to experiment, moving into progressive rock.

At the end of 1974 Stormy Six and other musicians in Milan formed a music cooperative called L'Orchestra which was aimed at "promoting all sorts of non-commercial music, and included avantgarde, jazz, political, protest and popular music". It also became an independent record label which the musicians managed themselves and on which Stormy Six released many of their own singles and albums. Stormy Six played a leading role in the affairs of L'Orchestra.

Stormy Six's exposure to and collaboration with foreign artists began in 1975 when English avant-rock group Henry Cow first toured Italy. Stormy Six invited Henry Cow to join L'Orchestra  which cemented a relationship between the two bands. Later, in 1978, Henry Cow invited Stormy Six and three other European groups to perform at a Rock in Opposition (RIO) festival in London. As one of the five original RIO members, Stormy Six participated actively in the shaping of RIO as an organisation. In 1979 Stormy Six organised a second RIO festival in Milan where the now seven RIO members performed in a week-long event.

Stormy Six's sixth album, L'Apprendista (1977) was well received in progressive rock circles, and their next album, Macchina Maccheronica (1980) won them a place in the "RIO genre". Henry Cow's Georgie Born guested on Macchina Maccheronica and performed with Stormy Six in several of their concerts at the time.

After recording one more album, Al Volo (1982), Stormy Six broke up in 1983.

In July 1983 three of the former Stormy Six members (Franco Fabbri, Umberto Fiori and Pino Martini) collaborated with German avant-rock group Cassiber (Chris Cutler from Henry Cow, Heiner Goebbels and Alfred Harth) for a public workshop and recording project at the Cantiere Internazionale d'Arte of Montepulciano. The recordings were subsequently broadcast by RAI Radio3, Italian Radio, and seven of the pieces later appeared under the name Cassix (Cassiber/Stormy Six) on the Recommended Records sound-magazine, Rē Records Quarterly Vol.1 No.3 (1986).

On 10 May 1993 a Stormy Six reunion took place for a performance at the Orfeo Theatre in Milan. The concert was recorded and later released on a live album, Un Concerto (1995).

Members
Stormy Six's line-up changed considerably over the years, with founding member Franco Fabbri being the only constant member.

Discography

Albums
Le Idee di Oggi Per la Musica di Domani (1969, LP, First)
L'Unitá (1972, LP, First)
Guarda giù dalla pianura (1974, LP, Ariston)
Un Biglietto del Tram (1975, LP, L'Orchestra)
Cliché (1976, LP, L'Orchestra)
L'Apprendista (1977, LP, L'Orchestra)
Macchina Maccheronica (1980, LP, L'Orchestra)
Al Volo (1982, LP, L'Orchestra)
Un Concerto (1995, CD, Arpa/Sensible)

Singles
"Oggi Piango" / "Il Mondo è Pieno di Gente" (1967, 7", Mini)
"Lui Verrà" / "L'amico e il Fico" (1967, 7", Mini)
"La Luna è Stanca" / "Lodi" (1970, 7", First)
"Alice Nel Vento" / "Il Venditore di Fumo" (1970, 7", First)
"Rossella" / "Leone" (1971, 7", First)
"Garibaldi" / "Tre Fratelli Contadini di Venosa" (1972, 7", First)
"Sotto il Bambù" / "Nicola fa il Maestro di Scuola" (1972, 7", First)
"1789" / "Carmine" (1976, 7", L'Orchestra)
"Cosa Danno" / "Reparto Novità" (1981, 7", L'Orchestra)

See also
Romantic Warriors II: A Progressive Music Saga About Rock in Opposition
Romantic Warriors II: Special Features DVD

References

External links
Stormy Six homepage.
Stormy Six. ItalianProg.com.
L'Orchestra. ItalianProg.com.
Stormy Six. ProgArchives.com.
Stormy Six. ProgWeed.net.
.

Musical groups established in 1966
Italian rock music groups
Rock in Opposition
Musical groups from Milan
1966 establishments in Italy